Seven Something (lit: "love 7 years, good 7 times") is a 2012 Thai Drama Romance Anthology film which separated to three parts, directed by Jira Maligool, Adisorn Trisirikasem and Paween Purikitpanya. The film commemorates the seven year establishment of GTH. The movie tells various love stories from three generations at different ages: 14, 21 and 42. In the first part, the relationship of a teenage couple is altered by the power of social networking. In the second part, an acting couple's relationship is put to test as fame takes its toll. In the last episode, a 42-year-old reporter encounters a tragic loss in her life; when she meets a young marathon runner, her life is changed forever. It was released on July 26, 2012. The film stars Jirayu La-ongmanee as Puan, Sutatta Udomsilp as Milk, Sunny Suwanmethanon as John Sirin Horwang as Mam, Nickhun Horvejkul as He, Suquan Bulakul as She, and Panissara Phimpru as Sairoong.

Plot summary
Seven Something is a love story and was shot by three different directors. As such, the film is divided into three parts; the first is named "14," featuring problems of two teenagers and social networks. The second part is named "21/28" and is about two former actor and actress lovers who work together again after being apart for seven years. The third part is called "42.195" and is about a woman who meets a young man who encourages her to complete a marathon.

Beginning with "14" directed by Paween Purijitpanya (Director of Phobia, Phobia 2), this is the love story of Puan (Jirayu La-ongmanee) and Milk (Sutatta Udomsilp). Their love will never be the same once Puan changes his Facebook's status to "In A Relationship" and starts to incessantly post clips proclaiming his love towards Milk. For Puan, each and every moment and emotion for Milk is conveyed with each upload. There are so many comments from nosy people that the total views reach almost viral levels. Puan becomes very obsessed with this online world filled with strangers and as a result his girlfriend's love for him fades with every "Like" click on his Facebook's wall.

Next is "21/28" directed by Adisorn Tresirikasem (Director of BTS - Bangkok Traffic Love Story) - a story of how two former superstars who starred in a critically acclaimed film together deals with their emotions as their careers go downhill experiencing failure in finances and fame. All they have to hold on to is their one-hit-wonder movie. Now, the actress Mam (Sirin Horwang), who is 28 years old, is struggling to get back in front of the camera again. The chance arrives when the studio announces plans to make a sequel to their hit movie. Both Mam and John (Sunny Suwanmethanon) will get a chance to be stars on the big screen again. However, John has long left the movie scene becoming a caretaker of aquatic animals in an aquarium. Mam will have to make her way to find John, who was once handsome, but is now a vulgar overweight man who drinks a lot of beer.

And the last story is "42.195" by award-winning director Jira Maligool (Director of Mekhong Full Moon Party and The Tin Mine) which conceptualizes the parallels of life and running a marathon. The human life's mileage is not much different from the kilometer sign that shows the distance of the marathon. The story is about SHE (Suquan Bulakul) a 42 years old newsreader whose life changes and transitions to a whole new chapter once she meets He (Nickhun Horvejkul), a young marathon runner who invites her to join the Bangkok Marathon race. Her life will never be the same again.

Cast
 Jirayu La-ongmanee as Puan
 Sutatta Udomsilp as Milk
 Sunny Suwanmethanon as John
 Sirin Horwang as Mam
 Nickhun Horvejkul as He
 Suquan Bulakul as She
 Panissara Phimpru as Sairoong
Preechaya Pongthananikorn as Herself (cameo)
Pattarasaya Kreuasuwansiri as Herself (cameo)
Nuengthida Sophon as Herself (cameo)

Awards and nominations

References

External links
 
 Seven Something Movie at sanook!
 Seven Something Movie at K@POOK!

2012 films
Thai-language films
Thai romantic drama films
GMM Tai Hub films
2012 romantic drama films
Films shot in Thailand
Films shot in Bangkok